The Palestinian ambassador in Santiago de Chile is the official representative of the Palestinian government to the Government of Chile.

List of representatives

References 

Chile
Palestine
Ambassadors of the State of Palestine to Chile